Second Story Press is a book publishing company located in Toronto, Ontario, Canada. Its titles include the 
international bestseller Hana's Suitcase, about Hana Brady, which has been published in over forty countries around the world. The company is concerned with feminism, focusing on books featuring strong female characters and exploring themes of social justice, human rights, and ability issues.

Margie Wolfe, who co-founded the company with three other women in 1988, is Publisher, Owner, and President. Authors published by Second Story Press include Rachna Gilmore, Kathy Kacer, Karen Levine, Kathleen McDonnell, Ami Sands Brodoff, Joanne Robertson and Kathy Stinson. Second Story publishes both the Women's Hall of Fame series and the Holocaust Remembrace series of books for children.

Second Story Press is a member of the Association of Canadian Publishers, the Organization of Book Publishers of Ontario, and the Canadian Children's Book Centre. It also receives funding from the Canada Council for the Arts and the Ontario Arts Council.

References

External links
 Second Story Press, official website
 Author Kathy Kacer's home page
 Author Kathleen McDonnell's home page

Book publishing companies of Canada
Publishing companies established in 1988